Harold H. Thurber (November 23, 1892 - July 27, 1968) was an American jockey in Thoroughbred racing who was a subject in a Franklin Brooke Voss oil painting sitting aboard Nimba, a filly he guided to 1927 American Champion Three-Year-Old Filly honors for owner Marshall Field III.

Background
A native of North Dakota, Harold Thurber rode primarily at racetracks on the East Coast of the United States and in Kentucky. In 1924 he rode under contract for Robert L. Gerry Sr. and Marshall Field III.
In winning the 1926 Edgemere Handicap at Aqueduct Racetrack Harry Richards rode Peanuts to a new world record time for a mile and one-eighth on dirt with a clocking of 1:48.60.  In 1928 he was aboard Lawley for a sixth-place finish in the 1928 Kentucky Derby.

References

1892 births
1968 deaths
American jockeys
Sportspeople from Nebraska